Ibitiara is a municipality in the state of Bahia in the North-East region of Brazil.

See also
List of municipalities in Bahia

References

Municipalities in Bahia